The 85th District of the Iowa House of Representatives in the state of Iowa.

Current elected officials
Christina Bohannan is the representative currently representing the district.

Past representatives
The district has previously been represented by:
 Norman Rodgers, 1971–1973
 Adrian B. Brinck, 1973–1975
 Clay R. Spear, 1975–1983
 Florence Buhr, 1983–1991
 Thomas Baker, 1991–1993
 Hubert Houser, 1993–2001
 Gerald D. Jones, 2001–2003
 Jim Lykam, 2003–2013
 Vicki Lensing, 2013–2021
 Christina Bohannan, 2021–present

References

085